Maliarpha longisignumella is a species of snout moth in the genus Maliarpha. It was described by Cook in 1997, and is known from India.

References

Moths described in 1997
Anerastiini